Emma Louise Lewell-Buck (born 8 November 1978) is a Labour Party politician, who has been the Member of Parliament (MP) for South Shields since winning a by-election in 2013. She is South Shields’s first female MP.

Early life
From a family of shipyard workers, Lewell-Buck was born in South Shields. She is a direct descendant of William Wouldhave, the inventor of the lifeboat.

Lewell-Buck attended St Joseph's Catholic Academy in Hebburn. She studied politics and media studies at Northumbria University, before gaining a master's degree in social work from Durham University.

As a social worker, she specialised in child protection, and later  represented the Primrose ward in Jarrow as a South Tyneside councillor from 2004 to 2013.

Parliamentary career
Lewell-Buck won a by-election with a reduced majority at a 2013 by-election following David Miliband's decision to leave the House of Commons.

In June 2013, she became a member of the Environment, Food and Rural Affairs Select Committee replacing Thomas Docherty. In October 2013, she was appointed Private Parliamentary Secretary to Ivan Lewis, Labour's Shadow Northern Ireland Secretary.

In 2014, she claimed that some people were "having to bury their relatives in their back gardens" as she proposed a Funeral Services Bill intended to require funeral providers to offer a low-cost option.

In July 2015, she was elected as a member of the Work and Pensions Select Committee.

In January 2016, Lewell-Buck became shadow minister for devolution and local government in Jeremy Corbyn's frontbench reshuffle. On 29 June 2016, she announced her resignation from the post, commenting that she was "heartbroken at the state of the [Labour] Party". This was a reference to a string of shadow cabinet resignations during the summer leadership crisis. She later supported Owen Smith in the failed attempt to replace Jeremy Corbyn in the 2016 Labour Party leadership election.

In October 2016, she was re-appointed to Jeremy Corbyn's front bench team as Shadow Education Minister responsible for children and families' policy. She resigned from this position in March 2019 after voting against a second Brexit referendum in defiance of the Labour whip.

In October 2019, local party members voted to trigger a reselection contest. She vowed to fight the contest and branded those who voted against her as "bullies and tricksters". Due to the calling of the 2019 general election, the reselection process could not be completed in time and she was successfully re-elected as MP for South Shields without a local party vote taking place.

Political positions
Lewell-Buck joined the All-Party Parliamentary Group on Hunger and Food Poverty chaired by Frank Field and the Bishop of Truro. The group launched an inquiry into the root causes behind hunger, food poverty and the rise in demand of food banks across the UK, and published its final report in the House of Commons on 8 December 2014. After the report Lewell-Buck said in Parliament "Food poverty is a clear consequence of the Government's ideological assault on the social safety net and the people who rely on it. One hungry person is a complete disgrace, but thousands of hungry people are a national disaster."

In November 2017 Lewell-Buck introduced a Private Members' Bill (under the Ten Minute Rule), the Food Insecurity Bill, "to require the Government to monitor and report on food insecurity and to make provision for official statistics on food insecurity." The bill was passed for second reading to be heard 2 February 2018.

During Lewell-Buck's election campaign of 2013, she said helping to bring jobs to the unemployed of South Shields was a priority. In November 2013 she organised a jobs fair in her constituency, which was repeated in November 2014 after she pledged to make it into an annual event.

In 2018, Lewell-Buck expressed concern about the large number of children in care; there were 75,420 children in care in England in March 2018, a rise of 4% from the year before. She said the rise was due to government cuts to support services like Sure Start, which could help children stay with their families. Lewell-Buck said, "The government is missing valuable opportunities to keep children in the care of their families. Not only does that add pressure to budgets already decimated by austerity, it also leaves children and their families with deep and enduring emotional scars."

Lewell-Buck is opposed to COVID-19 vaccine passports and was one of 8 Labour MPs who voted against their introduction as part of the government's 'Plan B' restrictions in December 2021. She was also one of 22 Labour MPs who voted against mandatory vaccination of NHS staff.

Employment of husband
Lewell-Buck employed her husband, Simon, as a researcher in 2015 despite his being suspended from his job as a carer and having lost his place on a nursing course in response to allegations of swearing at and neglect of vulnerable adults in his care. The allegations were upheld. However, a watchdog investigation found the local authority had made procedural errors and was asked to pay £400 in compensation to Mr Buck. An independent social worker also reviewed the evidence and found that no abuse had taken place. Several members of her Constituency Labour Party wrote to party leader Jeremy Corbyn to request her suspension owing to their concerns over his playing this role. Mr Buck was subsequently suspended from the Labour Party, pending investigation.

Personal life 
Lewell-Buck was diagnosed with dyspraxia at the age of 27.

Lewell-Buck married Simon Buck in 2013. They separated in 2020.

References

External links

Emma Lewell-Buck's councillor home page

1978 births
Living people
21st-century British women politicians
Alumni of Durham University
Alumni of Northumbria University
Councillors in Tyne and Wear
English social workers
Female members of the Parliament of the United Kingdom for English constituencies
Labour Party (UK) councillors
Labour Party (UK) MPs for English constituencies
People from South Shields
Politicians from Tyne and Wear
UK MPs 2010–2015
UK MPs 2015–2017
UK MPs 2017–2019
UK MPs 2019–present
21st-century English women
21st-century English people
Women councillors in England